Laza Kostić Gymnasium is a secondary school in Novi Sad, Serbia. It is named after Laza Kostić, a famous Serbian writer and poet. It was founded in 1996, and is the youngest of the four gymnasiums in Novi Sad. Classes are done exclusively in Serbian.

History
While Laza Kostić Gymnasium is one of the youngest gymnasiums in the country, the building it resides in was built in 1926. Several schools would exchange the use of the building, until 1 September 1996, when the department of Svetozar Marković Gymnasium was formed. On 28 May 1998, it was temporarily named as Gymnasium with full responsibility, while on 17 May, 2000, the government decided to rename the school to its current name of Gymnasium "Laza Kostić".

In 2006, the school was extensively renovated, when the old pavilions were replaced by two modern school buildings, where most of the classes and the school theater are held. The renovations were completed by fall of 2007.

Since 2008, the Novi Sad New Theater is hosted in the school with the goal of spreading the love of theater and dramatic performances among the youth through local and international theater performances.

References

External links
 Official site of the school (Serbian)

Education in Novi Sad
Educational institutions established in 1996
Schools in Serbia
Schools in Vojvodina
Gymnasiums in Novi Sad
Buildings and structures in Novi Sad